Levan Melkadze (born 12 December 1979) is a Georgian footballer.

He has played for TSU Tbilisi, Tbilisi, FC WIT Georgia, AC Siena and FC Dinamo Tbilisi. In the 2005 season Melkadze was the topscorer in the Georgian Premier League scoring 27 goals in 31 matches for FC Dinamo Tbilisi. The Norwegian club Vålerenga bought him ahead of the 2006 season, but he did not impress and they released him from his contract the following summer. He subsequently joined Kazakhstani team FC Shakhter.

He has 5 caps for the Georgian national team.

References

External links

1979 births
Living people
Footballers from Georgia (country)
Expatriate footballers from Georgia (country)
A.C.N. Siena 1904 players
FC Dinamo Tbilisi players
Vålerenga Fotball players
FC Shakhter Karagandy players
FC Zestafoni players
FC Sioni Bolnisi players
Erovnuli Liga players
Eliteserien players
Kazakhstan Premier League players
Georgia (country) international footballers
Expatriate footballers in Italy
Expatriate footballers in Norway
Expatriate footballers in Kazakhstan
Expatriate sportspeople from Georgia (country) in Italy
Expatriate sportspeople from Georgia (country) in Norway
Expatriate sportspeople from Georgia (country) in Kazakhstan
Association football forwards